King of the Romans was the title used by the king of Germany following his election by the princes from the reign of Henry II (1002–1024) onward. 

The title originally referred to any German king between his election until his being crowned Emperor by the Pope. The title was also used to designate the successor to the throne elected during the lifetime of a sitting Emperor. From the 16th century onwards, as German kings adopted the title of Emperor-elect and ceased to be crowned by the Pope, the title continued to be used solely for a elected successor to the throne during his predecessor's lifetime.

The actual title varied over time. During the Ottonian period, it was King of the Franks (German: König der Franken, Latin: Rex Francorum), from the late Salian period it was King of the Romans (German: König der Römer, Lat.: Rex Romanorum). In the Modern Period, the title King in Germania (German: König in Germanien, Lat.: Germaniae Rex) came into use. Finally, modern German historiography established the term Roman-German King (Römisch-deutscher König) to differentiate it both from the classical Roman Emperor as well as from the modern German Emperor.

Ruling kings

History and usage

The territory of East Francia was not referred to as the Kingdom of Germany or Regnum Teutonicum by contemporary sources until the 11th century. During this time, the king's claim to coronation was increasingly contested by the papacy culminating in the fierce Investiture Controversy. After the Salian heir apparent Henry IV, a six-year-old minor, had been elected to rule the Empire in 1056 he adopted Romanorum Rex as a title to emphasize his sacred entitlement to be crowned Emperor by the Pope. Pope Gregory VII insisted on using the derogatory term Teutonicorum Rex ("King of the Germans") in order to imply that Henry's authority was merely local and did not extend over the whole Empire. Henry continued to regularly use the title Romanorum Rex until he finally was crowned Emperor by Antipope Clement III in 1084. Henry's successors imitated this practice, and were also called Romanorum Rex before and Romanorum Imperator after their Roman coronations.

Medieval practice

Candidates for the kingship were at first the heads of Germanic stem duchies. As these units broke up, rulers of smaller principalities and even non-Germanic rulers were considered for the position. The only requirements generally observed were that the candidate be an adult male, a Catholic Christian, and not in holy orders. The kings were elected by several Imperial Estates (secular princes as well as Prince-Bishops), often in the imperial city of Frankfurt after 1147, a custom recorded in the Schwabenspiegel code in about 1275.

Originally all noblemen present could vote by unanimous acclamation, but later a franchise was granted to only the most eminent bishops and noblemen, and according to the Golden Bull of 1356 issued by Emperor Charles IV only the seven Prince-electors had the right to participate in a majority voting as determined by the 1338 Declaration of Rhense. They were the Prince-Archbishops of Mainz, Trier and Cologne as well as the King of Bohemia, the Count Palatine of the Rhine, the Saxon duke, and the Margrave of Brandenburg. After the Investiture Controversy, Charles intended to strengthen the legal status of the Rex Romanorum beyond Papal approbation. Consequently, among his successors only Sigismund and Frederick III were still crowned Emperors in Rome and in 1530 Charles V was the last king to receive the Imperial Crown at the hands of the Pope (in Bologna). The Golden Bull remained effective as constitutional law until the Empire's dissolution in 1806.

After his election, the new king would be crowned as King of the Romans (Romanorum Rex), usually at Charlemagne's throne in Aachen Cathedral by the Archbishop of Cologne in a solemnly celebrated ceremony. The details of Otto's coronation in 936 are described by the medieval chronicler Widukind of Corvey in his Res gestae saxonicae. The kings received the Imperial Crown from at least 1024, at the coronation of Conrad II. In 1198 the Hohenstaufen candidate Philip of Swabia was crowned Rex Romanorum at Mainz Cathedral (as was King Rupert centuries later), but he had another coronation in Aachen after he had prevailed against his Welf rival Otto IV.

At some time after the ceremony, the king would, if possible, cross the Alps, to receive coronation in Pavia or Milan with the Iron Crown of Lombardy as King of Italy. Finally, he would travel to Rome and be crowned Emperor by the Pope. Because it was rarely possible for the elected King to proceed immediately to Rome for his crowning, several years might elapse between election and coronation, and some Kings never completed the journey to Rome at all. As a suitable title for the King between his election and his coronation as Emperor, Romanorum Rex would stress the plenitude of his authority over the Empire and his warrant to be future Emperor (Imperator futurus) without infringing upon the Papal privilege.

Not all Kings of the Romans made this step, sometimes because of hostile relations with the Pope, or because either the pressure of business at home or warfare in Germany or Italy made it impossible for the King to make the journey. In such cases, the king might retain the title "King of the Romans" for his entire reign.

Later developments

The title Romanorum Rex ceased to be used for ruling kings after 1508, when the Pope permitted King Maximilian I to use the title of Electus Romanorum Imperator ("elected Emperor of the Romans") after he failed in a good-faith attempt to journey to Rome. At this time Maximilian also took the new title "King in Germania" (Germaniae rex, König in Germanien), but the latter was never used as a primary title. 

Maximilian's titles read, in part: "Maximilian von Gots genaden erwelter Romischer Romischer kayser, zu allen zeiten merer des Reichs, in Germanien zu Hungern, Dalmatien, Croatien etc. kunig […] ("Maximilian by God's grace Elected Roman Emperor, always Augustus, in Germany, of Hungary, Dalamatia, Croatia etc King […]"

Beginning with Ferdinand I, Holy Roman Emperor, the rulers of the Empire no longer sought the Imperial coronation by the Pope and styled themselves "Emperors" without Papal approval, taking the title as soon as they were crowned in Germany or, if crowned in their predecessor's lifetime, upon the death of a sitting Emperor.

Heirs designate

The Holy Roman Empire was an elective monarchy. No person had an automatic legal right to the succession simply because he was related to the current Emperor. However, the Emperor could, and often did, have a relative (usually a son) elected to succeed him after his death. This elected heir apparent bore the title "King of the Romans".

During the Middle Ages, a junior King of the Romans was normally chosen only when the senior ruler bore the title of Emperor, so as to avoid having two, theoretically equal kings. Only on one occasion (1147-1150) was there both a ruling King of the Romans (King Conrad III) and a King of the Romans as heir (Henry Berengar). This practice continued from the 16th century onwards as the rulers of the Empire assumed the title "Emperor elect" without Imperial coronation by the Pope. The title of a King of the Romans now exclusively referred to the elected successor during his predecessor's lifetime.

The election was in the same form as that of the senior ruler. In practice, however, the actual administration of the Empire was always managed by the Emperor (or Emperor elect), with at most certain duties delegated to the heir.

King of Rome 
When Napoleon I, Emperor of the French, had a son and heir, Napoleon II (181132), he introduced the title as King of Rome (Roi de Rome), styling his son as such at birth. The boy was often known colloquially by this title throughout his short life. However, from 1818 onward, he was styled officially as the Duke of Reichstadt by his maternal grandfather, Emperor Francis I of Austria.

List

The following list shows all individuals bearing the title "Kings of the Romans". The regnal dates given are those between a king's election as "King of the Romans" and either becoming Emperor or ending their reign by deposition or death. Ruling kings are coloured in yellow, while those whose claim to the throne failed to achieve widespread support are coloured in pink. Individuals that bore the title "Kings of the Romans" solely as heirs designate are coloured in silver. '*' indicates that the king in question was elected in his predecessor's lifetime.

See also

List of German monarchs, rulers of the Holy Roman Empire  and Germany, including those using titles other than "King of the Romans"
List of Holy Roman Emperors

Notes

References

This article uses material translated from the corresponding article in the German-language Wikipedia, which, in turn, cites a source that contains further references:
H. Beumann: Rex Romanorum, in: Lexikon des Mittelalters (Dictionary of the Middle Ages, 9 vols., Munich-Zürich 1980-98), vol. 7, col. 777 f.

 
German kings
Heirs to the throne
Holy Roman Empire-related lists
Holy Roman Empire royalty
King of the Romans
Medieval German nobility